Plesiocystiscus mariae is a species of sea snail, a marine gastropod mollusk, in the family Cystiscidae.

References

mariae
Gastropods described in 2014